Little Lost Girls Blues is the debut album by the American neo soul singer N'Dambi, released in 1999. N'Dambi sold 50,000 copies of the album through her own label, Cheeky I Productions.

Critical reception
Exclaim! thought that "while laced with the loping bass lines and so-called 'neo-soul' overtones one might expect, it’s the overall durability and consistency that encourages repeat spins." Vibe wrote that the singer "maintains a somber tempo and alto pitch throughout the majority of the album, but she breaks out the funk on 'Lonely Woman'."

Track listing
 "Picture This"             - 2:37
 "Deep"                     - 4:14
 "Rain"                     - 3:52
 "What's Wrong With You"    - 4:22
 "The Meeting"              - 5:58
 "See Ya In My Dreams"      - 5:16
 "Lonely Woman"             - 5:50
 "Soul From The Abyss"      - 4:57
 "The Sunshine"             - 3:48
 "Can This Be Love"         - 5:52
 "I Think For Sure"         - 5:25
 "Broke My Heart"           - 4:22
 "Crazy World"              - 4:42
 "Lonely Woman (Interlude)" - 7:37

References

1999 albums
N'dambi albums